The following games were initially announced as Nintendo Entertainment System and/or Family Computer titles, however were subsequently cancelled or postponed indefinitely by developers or publishers.

References

 
Nintendo Entertainment System games
Nintendo Entertainment System